The tractor RS01 with the brand name Pionier (english: Pioneer) is the first tractor produced in the GDR. Production started in 1949 in the VEB Horch Kraftfahrzeug- und Motorenwerke Zwickau plant, the production was moved to the newly founded VEB Schlepperwerk Nordhausen in 1950. The RS01 is based on the FAMO XL, which was produced before World War II by FAMO.

The Pinonier RS01/40 

After the construction plans of the FAMO XL tractor were revised and optimized for the given production capabilities by former FAMO engineers in Schönebeck, the Horch plant in Zwickau started the production of the RS01 in 1949 because the tractor plant in Schönebeck did not have enough production capability. The first RS01 was shown to the public at the Leipzig Trade Fair in 1949 with a FAMO logo at the grill. 2250 tractors were produced from 1949 to 1950. In 1950, the production was moved to the tractor plant Nordhausen, the tractor was renamed: RS01 Pionier. It was produced until 1956. Starting in 1957, the tractor was revised. The new name was RS01 Harz. The production of the Harz ended in 1958, when 2175 Harz-tractors had been produced. This caused a gap in the 30-kW-class. In 1966 the RS14/40 filled the gap as the successor of the Harz.

Technical description 

The RS01 uses a frameless block construction with a rigid rear axle and a front swing axle with leaf springs. Engines of the type 4F 145 BE were used, they are water-cooled inline four cylinder four stroke diesel engines with prechamber injection and five litres of displacement. The rated power is 29.4 kW. These engines were started using a crank and petrol, they were switched to diesel fuel afterwards. The torque is transmitted to the mechanical five speed gearbox with a single disc dry clutch; only the rear wheels are driven. They are equipped with drum brakes, the handbrake is a gear box brake. For power take-off, the RS01 has a clutch dependent PTO. A belt pulley was also available for the RS01. Starting in 1953, the prechamber engine was replaced with a swirl chamber engine, which was started using compressed air.

The Harz-tractor is an optimized model of the Pionier. It has a new swirl chamber engine producing 31 kW, which was started with an electric 24 volts starter motor. The gearbox was replaced with a different model and an oil-hydraulic hitch was placed in the back of the tractor.

Technical specifications

References

Bibliography 
 Achim Bischof: Traktoren in der DDR - Podszun-Verlag, 2004, .

Tractors
IFA vehicles